Bjarne Olsen (24 July 1898 – 19 June 1976) was a Norwegian footballer. He played in one match for the Norway national football team in 1925.

References

External links
 

1898 births
1976 deaths
Norwegian footballers
Norway international footballers
Place of birth missing
Association footballers not categorized by position